Min Ko Thu (born 4 December 1992) is a footballer from Burma, and a defender for Yangon United.

Club career
In 2012, Rakhine United choose Min Ko Thu for Rakhine United Youth team. One year later, he became a Rakhine United senior player and played first time ever professional game. After 4 years played in Rakhine United, he transfer to Hanthawady United. Min Ko Thu played main defender at Hnathawady United about 3 years and 2018 December, he suddenly moved to Yangon United.  His first appearance of AFC for Yangon United is against Ceres Negros won 2-1 at Away.

References

1992 births
Living people
Burmese footballers
Myanmar international footballers
Yangon United F.C. players
Association football defenders